Lebanon participated in the 2010 Asian Para Games–First Asian Para Games in Guangzhou, China from 13 to 19 December 2010. Athletes from Lebanon won two medals, and finished at the 27th spot in a medal table.

References

Nations at the 2010 Asian Para Games
2010 in Lebanese sport
Lebanon at the Asian Para Games